The metallic coleophora moth (Coleophora mayrella) is a moth of the family Coleophoridae. It is native to Europe and Armenia, but is an adventive species in the Nearctic realm, where it is found throughout the United States and southern Canada. It has also been recorded from New Zealand, Chile and Argentina.

Description
The adults have a bronzy or greenish metallic sheen with no markings. The blackish antennae are white ringed to the apex and the basal 2/5 is thickened with projecting scales.

They fly during the day as well as after dark. They are on wing in June and July in western Europe and from May to August in North America.

The larvae feed within the flowers of white clover (Trifolium repens) where they feed on the seeds. A larval case is built in the later stages. The habitat consists of grassy areas and waste ground.

References

External links

 Bestimmungshilfe für die in Europa nachgewiesenen Schmetterlingsarten
 Bug Guide

mayrella
Moths described in 1813
Moths of Asia
Moths of Europe
Moths of New Zealand
Moths of North America
Moths of South America
Taxa named by Jacob Hübner